Hockey at the 1956 Olympics may refer to:

Ice hockey at the 1956 Winter Olympics
Field hockey at the 1956 Summer Olympics